Masseyville is an unincorporated community in Chester County, Tennessee.

Geography
The community is situated on Tennessee State Route 225.

History

Masseyville is an unincorporated community located along Tennessee State Route 225 and was originally part of McNairy County, but became part of Chester County when that county was formed in 1882. It was named for an early settler, Bill Massey.
The Masseyville Post Office was opened in 1884 and discontinued in 1915.

References 

Chester County Tennessee History and Families 1882 - 1995, Copyright 1995 Chester County Historical Society

Unincorporated communities in Chester County, Tennessee
Unincorporated communities in Tennessee
Jackson metropolitan area, Tennessee